Welty Run is a  long 3rd order tributary to Sewickley Creek in Westmoreland County, Pennsylvania.  This is the only stream of this name in the United States.

Variant names
According to the Geographic Names Information System, it has also been known historically as:
Welly Run

Course
Welty Run rises about 3 miles southeast of Weltytown, Pennsylvania, and then flows west to join Sewickley Creek at Norvelt, Pennsylvania.

Watershed
Welty Run drains  of area, receives about 44.4 in/year of precipitation, has a wetness index of 393.98, and is about 52% forested.

References

 
Tributaries of the Ohio River
Rivers of Pennsylvania
Rivers of Westmoreland County, Pennsylvania
Allegheny Plateau